State Route 251 (SR 251) is a north–south state highway located in the southwestern portion of the U.S. state of Ohio.

Route description
The path of SR 251 takes it through northern Brown County and southwestern Clinton County.  SR 251 is not included as a component of the National Highway System.

History
When it was designated in 1925, SR 251 was routed along what is now US 68 between US 50 in Fayetteville and the current northern terminus of SR 251 south of St. Martin. US 68's predecessor, SR 53, concurrent with US 50 east to the current southern terminus of SR 251, and then followed the entire present alignment of SR 251 before resuming its northward path along the current alignment of US 68. In 1930, SR 251 and SR 53 swapped alignments, such that SR 53 now followed a straight alignment north out of Fayetteville that US 68 utilizes today, and SR 251 now appeared along its present-day routing.

Major intersections

References

External links

251
Transportation in Brown County, Ohio
Transportation in Clinton County, Ohio